Franciscus Gerardus Cornelis Josephus Marie "Frans" Teulings (15 November 1891 – 23 June 1966) was a Dutch politician of the defunct Roman Catholic State Party (RKSP) and later co-founder of the Catholic People's Party (KVP) now merged into the Christian Democratic Appeal (CDA) party and economist.

Teulings worked as student researcher at the University of Amsterdam June 1916 until July 1918. Teulings worked for the publishing company C.N. Teulings in 's-Hertogenbosch from August 1918 until September 1929 and as COO from November 1920 until September 1929. Teulings was elected as a Member of the House of Representatives after the election of 1929, taking office on 17 September 1929. In May 1937 Teulings was nominated as Chairman of the supervisory board of the Catholic Radio Broadcasting serving from 10 May 1937 until 18 May 1940. On 10 May 1940 Nazi Germany invaded the Netherlands and the government fled to London to escape the German occupation. During World War II Teulings continued to serve as a Member of the House of Representatives but in reality the De facto political influence of the House of Representatives was marginalized. During the German occupation Teulings worked as an education administrator for the board of education of the Our Secondary Education association and as Chairman from 11 July 1941 until 20 September 1949. Following the end of World War II Queen Wilhelmina ordered a Recall of Parliament and Teulings remained a Member of the House of Representatives, taking office on 20 November 1945.

On 22 December 1945 the Roman Catholic State Party was renamed as the Catholic People's Party, Teulings was one of the co-founders and became one of the unofficial Deputy Leader of the Catholic People's Party. Teulings was selected as Parliamentary leader of the Catholic People's Party in the House of Representatives following the appointment of Laurentius Nicolaas Deckers as a Member of the Council of State, taking office on 1 April 1946. After the election of 1946 the Leader of the Catholic People's Party Carl Romme was elected as a Member of the House of Representatives and took over as Parliamentary leader on 4 June 1946. Teulings was elected as a Member of the Senate after the Senate election of 1948, he resigned as a Member of the House of Representatives the day he was installed as a Member of the Senate, taking office on 27 July 1948. Teulings was appointed as Minister of the Interior in the Cabinet Drees-Van Schaik following the appointment of Johan van Maarseveen as Minister of Colonial Affairs, taking office on 20 September 1949. The Cabinet Drees-Van Schaik fell on 24 January 1951 and continued to serve in a demissionary capacity until the cabinet formation of 1951 when it was replaced by Cabinet Drees I with Teulings appointed as Deputy Prime Minister and Minister for Civil Defence, taking office on 15 March 1951. Teulings served again as acting Minister of the Interior from 18 November 1951 until 6 December 1951 following the death of Johan van Maarseveen. In June 1952 Teulings announced that he would not stand for the election of 1952 but wanted to return to the Senate. After the Senate election of 1952 Teulings returned as a Member of the Senate, serving from 15 July 1952 until his resignation on 3 May 1957. Following the cabinet formation of 1952 Teulings per his own request asked not to be considered for a cabinet post in the new cabinet, the Cabinet Drees I was replaced by the Cabinet Drees II on 2 September 1952.

Teulings also became active in the private sector and worked as COO and Vice Chairman of the Board of directors of investment firm CEBEMA in 's-Hertogenbosch from November 1952 until December 1961. Teulings was known for his abilities as a consensus builder and manager. Teulings continued to comment on political affairs until his death.

Decorations

References

External links

  Mr. F.G.C.J.M. (Frans) Teulings Parlement & Politiek
  Mr. F.G.C.J.M. Teulings (KVP) Eerste Kamer der Staten-Generaal

 
 

 

1891 births
1966 deaths
Catholic People's Party politicians
Commanders of the Order of Orange-Nassau
Deputy Prime Ministers of the Netherlands
Dutch corporate directors
Dutch nonprofit directors
Dutch fiscal jurists
Dutch financial analysts
Dutch people of World War II
Dutch political party founders
Dutch public broadcasting administrators
Dutch Roman Catholics
Dutch school administrators
Knights of the Holy Sepulchre
Knights of the Order of the Netherlands Lion
Members of the House of Representatives (Netherlands)
Members of the Senate (Netherlands)
Ministers of the Interior of the Netherlands
Ministers without portfolio of the Netherlands
People from 's-Hertogenbosch
People from Vught
Roman Catholic State Party politicians
University of Amsterdam alumni
Academic staff of the University of Amsterdam
20th-century Dutch civil servants
20th-century Dutch economists
20th-century Dutch jurists
20th-century Dutch politicians